Lorenzo Dow Baker (March 15, 1840 in Wellfleet, Massachusetts – June 21, 1908) was an American sailor, ship's captain and businessman whose 1870 voyage from the Orinoco to Jamaica and then to Philadelphia launched the modern banana production industry.  In 1881 he partnered with his brother-in-law Elisha Hopkins to form L.D. Baker & Co.  In 1885 he joined forces with Andrew W. Preston and eight others to form the Boston Fruit Company, which led to several successive partnerships, ending in the 1899 formation of the United Fruit Company, now Chiquita.

Baker's success caused Wellfleet to become a summer resort.

Baker left a fortune of $4 million upon his death in 1908.

References

American sailors
American food industry businesspeople
American businesspeople in shipping
19th-century American businesspeople
1840 births
1908 deaths